Leonid Yefimovich Heifetz (also spelled "Kheifets" ; 4 May 1934 – 18 April 2022) was a Russian stage director and drama teacher. He was the first husband of the actress Natalya Gundareva.

Biography
In 1995, Heifetz directed Janusz Glowacki's Antigone in New York, at the Contemporary Play School.

From 1998 to 2022 - director of the Mayakovsky Theatre.

In 2000, he staged the play The Cherry Orchard at the Mossovet Theatre.

He died on April 18, 2022 in Moscow at the age of 88 from a detached blood clot. Farewell to the director took place on April 21 at the Mayakovsky Theater. He was buried at the Troyekurovskoye Cemetery.

References 

1934 births
2022 deaths
People from Minsk
Russian  theatre directors
Recipients of the Order of Honour (Russia)
People's Artists of Russia
Soviet theatre directors